August Lehr (* 26 February 1871 in Frankfurt am Main; † 15 July 1921 in Ludwigslust) was a German racing cyclist.

August Lehr, who was a salesman by profession, started his career as an amateur cyclist on a penny-farthing or ordinary. From 1888 to 1894 he won seven times the German championship. In 1888, only 17 years old, Lehr won in England, in the "belly of the beast", the English championship in the ordinary category (the inofficial world championship over one english mile). In 1891 he was the best cyclist in the world according to wins accumulated. In 1893 he finally decided to change to the safety bicycle, which proofed to be a good decision because one year later he won the World Championship in Antwerp, becoming the first German world champion in track cycling. As a result of these successes Lehr received invitations to race all over Europe, that led him to a total of 260 career wins (according to other sources 227). However, his wins didn't prove enough to make a living. In 1898, he retired from his active racing career.

In 1909, the popular sports figure gave the start sign for the first Six Days of Berlin. In 1921, Lehr suffered gastrointestinal bleeding during a rowing trip on the Mecklenburg Lake Plateau, as a result of which he died a few days later.

When in 1925 the Waldstadion was constructed next to a 400 Meter velodrome in Lehr's hometown Frankfurt, the brothers Adam and Fritz von Opel financed the erection of a bronze memorial (by Emil Hub) in his honour. In 2005, during the renovation of the Waldstadions for the FIFA World Cup, the memorial was destroyed.

Literature 
 Hans Borowik: 300 Rennfahrer in einem Band, Berlin 1937.
 Adolf Klimanschewsky: Der entfesselte Weltmeister, Berlin 1955.
 Helmer Boelsen: Die Geschichte der Rad-Weltmeisterschaft, Bielefeld 2007 ISBN 978-3-936973-33-4.

References

1871 births
1921 deaths
German cycling road race champions
Cyclists from Frankfurt
UCI Track Cycling World Champions (men)
German track cyclists
German male cyclists
Deaths from bleeding